Walter Arthur Harrex Howarth (14 March 1882 – 12 July 1958) was an Australian politician who represented the Maitland for the United Australia Party (1932—1945) and the Liberal Party (1945—1956).
He was deputy leader of the New South Wales Liberal Party from 1946 to 1954.

Early life
Howarth was born to parents Walter Arthur Howarth, a bootmaker, and Elizabeth Ellen Peetwn at Campbelltown. Howarth jnr Married Edith Letitia Margaret Langlands on 3 February 1906 at Lidcombe and had five children through their marriage: three daughters and two sons. He was a building contractor and a carpenter by trade.

Political career
Howarth first entered politics in  1926 as a Councillor of Bolwarra Shire until 1932, during which he was Shire President for one term. He contested the New South Wales Lower House seat of Maitland for the United Australia Party and won election on 11 June 1932.

Howarth was re-elected to the seat of Maitland at the 1935, 1938, 1941, 1944, 1947, 1950 and  1953. Whilst a member of Parliament Howarth was party Whip from 1941 until 1946 and was Deputy Leader of the New South Wales Division of the Liberal Party from 1946 until 1954 under Leader Sir Vernon Treatt.

Death
Howarth died on 12 July 1958. His funeral was held at Beresfield crematorium from Mackay Memorial Presbyterian church ministers at Rutherford.

References

 

1882 births
1958 deaths
United Australia Party members of the Parliament of New South Wales
Liberal Party of Australia members of the Parliament of New South Wales
New South Wales local councillors
Members of the New South Wales Legislative Assembly
20th-century Australian politicians
20th-century Australian businesspeople